Stavros Letsas (born 6 March 1957) is a Greek former professional footballer who played as right back.

Club career
Letsas started playing football at the amateur club of Agioi Anargyroi and in 1978, when he reached the age of 21, the management of his club negotiated his transfer to Olympiacos, something he wanted to avoid being a fan of AEK Athens, as he preferred to wear the yellow-black jersey. A friendly match that his team played with AEK in Nea Filadelfeia at that time was the reason for his dream to come true. A catalytic role in his transfer to AEK was his coach at the time in Agioi Anargyroi and former football player of AEK, Kostas Papageorgiou.

Although Letsas immediately signed a contract, the recognition in AEK at that time was far from easy to the star roster of the club. Thus, after exhausting his first year as a substitute and without an official appearance, the following season he was loaned to Panelefsiniakos to return the following year and start participating in the team's matches. His first appearance was on 21 March 1982 in the home victory over Apollon Athens with 2–1, where he came as a sustitue at the 74th minute. He competed for the first time in the starting eleven on 11 April 1982 when he scored in the 20th minute the first of the two AEK goals in the 1–2 away victory over AEL. He initially played as a wing midfielder and in the development of his career in AEK he played as a full-back and as a central defender.
There were several factors that contributed to his football career being relatively short-lived. He suffered during it from three serious injuries that led him to three corresponding surgeries, resulting in long periods of recovery and his absence from the playing fields. His professional rehabilitation always concerned him and he understood that it would hardly come from football. Finally, the administrative reshuffles of the time in AEK after the departure of the club's president and major sharehoder, Loukas Barlos and the administrative instability presented by the Union played their part in his departure from the team in 1985. With AEK he won the Championship in 1979 and the Greek Cup in 1983. This was followed by a three-month stint at Egaleo until he made the final decision to hang up his football boots.

After football
Letsas  had studied engineering, a profession he still practices today working in the Municipality of Agioi Anargyroi. Immediately after his retirement as a footballer, he became involved in coaching, mainly in terms of amateur clubs and academies and infrastructure departments. He had been a member of the training team of AEK's infrastructure departments, having the sole responsibility of training the U14-15 team until 2016, where he has undertaken various positions in the club.

Honours

AEK Athens
Alpha Ethniki: 1978–79
Greek Cup: 1982–83

References

1957 births
Living people
Super League Greece players
AEK Athens F.C. players
Panelefsiniakos F.C. players
Egaleo F.C. players
Association football defenders
Footballers from Athens
Greek footballers